Cerithiella is a genus of minute sea snails, marine gastropod molluscs in the family Newtoniellidae.

This genus was described by Verrill in 1882.

Species
Species in the genus Cerithiella include:
 
 Cerithiella aethiopica Thiele, 1925
 Cerithiella amblytera (Watson, 1880)
 Cerithiella antarctica (E. A. Smith, 1907)
 Cerithiella argentata Thiele, 1925
 Cerithiella astrolabiensis (Strebel, 1908)
 Cerithiella atali M. Fernandes, Garofalo & Pimenta, 2015
 Cerithiella australis Cecalupo & Perugia, 2017
 Cerithiella austrina (Hedley, 1911)
 Cerithiella axicostulata Castellanos, Rolán & Bartolotta, 1987
 Cerithiella bisculpta (Strebel, 1908)
 Cerithiella burdwoodiana (Melvill & Standen, 1912)
 Cerithiella cacuminata (Hedley & Petterd, 1906) (taxon inquirendum)
 Cerithiella candela M. Fernandes, Garofalo & Pimenta, 2015
 Cerithiella cepene de Lima & de Barros, 2007
 Cerithiella danielsseni (Friele, 1877)
 Cerithiella elata Thiele, 1925
 Cerithiella enodis (Watson, 1880)
 Cerithiella eulimella Powell, 1958
 Cerithiella fallax Cecalupo & Perugia, 2017
 Cerithiella francescoi Cecalupo & Perugia, 2014
 † Cerithiella infelix (Marwick, 1931) 
 Cerithiella insignis (Jeffreys, 1885)
 Cerithiella kaitotsuzukii Cecalupo & Perugia, 2019
 Cerithiella laevis (Thiele, 1912)
 † Cerithiella limula Darragh, 2017 
 Cerithiella macroura (Melvill & Standen, 1912)
 † Cerithiella malakae Schnetler & M. S. Nielsen, 2018 
 Cerithiella martensii (Dall, 1889)
 Cerithiella metula (Lovén, 1846)
 Cerithiella natalensis Barnard, 1963
 Cerithiella nucleoproducta (Dell, 1956)
 † Cerithiella paroaensis P. A. Maxwell, 1988 
 Cerithiella pernambucoensis de Lima & de Barros, 2007
 Cerithiella pileata (Cotton, 1951)
 Cerithiella praerupta Cecalupo & Perugia, 2017
 Cerithiella producta Dall, 1927
 Cerithiella reunionensis (Jay & Drivas, 2002)
 † Cerithiella salmae Schnetler & M. S. Nielsen, 2018 
 Cerithiella seymouriana (Strebel, 1908)
 Cerithiella sigsbeana (Dall, 1881)
 Cerithiella stiria (Webster, 1906)
 Cerithiella subuliapex Barnard, 1963
 Cerithiella superba Thiele, 1912
 Cerithiella taylori Barnard, 1963
 Cerithiella terebriformis Thiele, 1925
 Cerithiella terebroides Kuroda & Habe, 1971
 Cerithiella terebroides Kuroda & Habe, 1971
 † Cerithiella thomsoni P. A. Maxwell, 1992 
 Cerithiella translucens Cecalupo & Perugia, 2017
 Cerithiella travani Cecalupo & Perugia, 2017
 † Cerithiella tricincta P. Marshall, 1919 
 Cerithiella trisulcata (Yokoyama, 1922)
 Cerithiella vidalensis Barnard, 1963
 Cerithiella werthi Thiele, 1912

Species brought into synonymy
 Cerithiella aliceae Dautzenberg & H. Fischer, 1896: synonym of Eumetula aliceae (Dautzenberg & Fischer H., 1896)
 Cerithiella bouvieri Dautzenberg & H. Fischer, 1896: synonym of Eumetula bouvieri (Dautzenberg & Fischer H., 1896)
 Cerithiella cincta (Thiele, 1912): synonym of Cerithiella antarctica (E. A. Smith, 1907)
 Cerithiella cossmanni Dautzenberg & H. Fischer, 1896: synonym of Krachia cossmanni (Dautzenberg & Fischer H., 1896)
 Cerithiella erecta Thiele, 1912: synonym of Cerithiella seymouriana (Strebel, 1908)
 Cerithiella guernei Dautzenberg & H. Fischer, 1896: synonym of Krachia guernei (Dautzenberg & Fischer H., 1896)
 Cerithiella lineata Egorova, 1982: synonym of Cerithiella laevis (Thiele, 1912)
 Cerithiella macrocephala Dautzenberg & H. Fischer, 1897: synonym of Cerithiella metula (Lovén, 1846)
 Cerithiella similis Thiele, 1912: synonym of Cerithiella astrolabiensis (Strebel, 1908)
 Cerithiella whiteavesi (Verrill, 1880): synonym of Cerithiella metula (Lovén, 1846)
 Cerithiella (Cerithiella) tydemani Schepman, 1909: synonym of Pseudovertagus nobilis (Reeve, 1855)

References

 Bouchet P. & Warén A. (1993). Revision of the Northeast Atlantic bathyal and abyssal Mesogastropoda. Bollettino Malacologico supplemento 3: 579-840
 Howson, C.M.; Picton, B.E. (Ed.) (1997). The species directory of the marine fauna and flora of the British Isles and surrounding seas. Ulster Museum Publication, 276. The Ulster Museum: Belfast, UK. . vi, 508 (+ cd-rom)
 Gofas, S.; Le Renard, J.; Bouchet, P. (2001). Mollusca, in: Costello, M.J. et al. (Ed.) (2001). European register of marine species: a check-list of the marine species in Europe and a bibliography of guides to their identification. Collection Patrimoines Naturels, 50: pp. 180–213
 Spencer, H.; Marshall. B. (2009). All Mollusca except Opisthobranchia. In: Gordon, D. (Ed.) (2009). New Zealand Inventory of Biodiversity. Volume One: Kingdom Animalia. 584 pp

Newtoniellidae
Gastropod genera
Taxa named by Addison Emery Verrill